Gamdi may refer to:

Gamdi (Ahmedabad district), a village in Ahmedabad district, Gujarat, India
Gamdi (Anand district), a town in Anand district, Gujarat, India